Antoine-Christophe Radigues (Russian:Антон Яковлевич Радиг; 7 November 1721, Reims - 20 July 1809, Saint Petersburg) was a French engraver and medallist who spent much of his career in Russia.

Biography 
His father, Jacques Radigues, was also an engraver, and probably gave Antoine his first lessons before he pursued formal studies in Paris. During the 1750s, he travelled extensively, to Holland, England and Germany. Some of his first engravings were illustrations for the fables of La Fontaine. He was invited to Russia in 1764, to teach at the Russian Academy of Sciences; replacing Georg Friedrich Schmidt, who had resigned following the death of his patroness, Empress Elizabeth. 

His first major assignment involved creating thirty images for a burial album of the Empress; a project that occupied him for three years and almost cost him his sight. It was left incomplete, and never published, by official orders. This may have been due to the fact that, since 1765, he had been teaching at the Imperial Academy of Arts, as well as the Academy of Sciences; something which caused displeasure at both institutions. This came to a head in 1769, and he was dismissed from his positions. 

He chose to remain in Saint Petersburg and work as a free-lance engraver. Numerous portraits were commissioned by the Golitsyn and Kurakin families. He also did two portraits of Catherine the Great, based on oil paintings by Vigilius Eriksen.

In 1789, he was allowed to return to the Imperial Academy. He was named an Academician in 1794, for his engraving of Ivan Betskoy, after an oil portrait by Alexander Roslin. He retired in 1795, and was awarded an annual pension. Nikolai Utkin is, perhaps, his best-known student.

His works may be seen at the State Russian Museum, the Hermitage Museum, and the Pushkin Museum, among others.

Sources 
 "Radigues, Antoine" from the Russian Biographical Dictionary, 1910
 
 Eduard Konovalov, Новый полный биографический словарь русских художников, Litres, 2017

External links 

 Biography of Radigues @ ArtInvestment

1721 births
1809 deaths
French engravers
French emigrants to Russia
Russian engravers
Imperial Academy of Arts
Artists from Reims